Paediatrics & Child Health  is a peer-reviewed medical journal of paediatrics and is the official journal of the Canadian Paediatric Society. It covers original research, practice guidelines, and continuing medical education. The journal was originally published by the Pulsus Group, but was transferred to Oxford University Press in 2016. It was established in 1996.

A different journal with a nearly identical title, Paediatrics and Child Health, is published in the United Kingdom. Both are distinct from the Journal of Paediatrics and Child Health.

References

External links 
 

Multilingual journals
Pediatrics journals
Publications established in 1996
Oxford University Press academic journals